Eorl may refer to:

 Eorl Crabtree (born 1982), an English rugby league player
 an Anglo-Saxon title of nobility, see Earl

See also
 Cirion and Eorl (or Cirion and Eorl and the Friendship of Gondor and Rohan), one of the Unfinished Tales by J. R. R. Tolkien
 Erilaz, in the Proto-Norse language